Zukići may refer to the following villages in Bosnia and Herzegovina:

Zukići (Kalesija)
Zukići (Konjic)
Zukići, Živinice